Tobacco Road may refer to:

Prose
Tobacco Road (novel) (1932), by Erskine Caldwell
Tobacco Road (play) (1933), by Jack Kirkland
Tobacco Road (film) (1941), directed by John Ford

Music
"Tobacco Road" (song) (1960s), by John D. Loudermilk
Also recorded by The Nashville Teens in 1964
Tobacco Road (Bobbie Gentry album), from the 1968 album The Delta Sweete
Tobacco Road (Common Market album)
Tobacco Road (Jack McDuff album)
Tobacco Road, an album by Lou Rawls

Other uses
 Tobacco Road (bar), in Miami, Florida
 Tobacco Road (rivalry), a rivalry between four universities in North Carolina
 Tobacco Road FC, an American soccer team based in Durham, North Carolina
 Tobacco Road Formation, a geologic formation in Georgia
 Tobacco Road, a road in Augusta, Georgia